Emirates Financial Towers is a 27 story twin-tower commercial development located in the Dubai International Financial Centre, Dubai’s central financial district.

The development, which was completed and handed over in June 2011, consists of office and retail units and the towers are connected on the 16th floor by a glass skybridge, designed as a food and beverage space.

Emirates Financial Towers holds the Guinness World Record for the largest automated parking system in the world.

The development was a joint venture between ENSHAA PSC and MAG Group.

References

External links
 New office spaces to test Dubai’s market
 Emirates Financial Towers in Aboutdubai.com
 Emirates Financial Towers on bnc bulletin

Buildings and structures under construction in Dubai